The Bells is the ninth solo studio album by American rock musician Lou Reed, released in April 1979 by Arista Records. It is recorded in binaural sound at Delta Studios in Wilster, West Germany. Production was handled by Reed with Michael Fonfara serving as executive producer. Three out of nine songs on the album are the product of a short-lived writing partnership between Reed and Nils Lofgren. More of the team's work appeared on Nils' solo studio album Nils, released the same year. Lofgren released his version of "Stupid Man" as "Driftin' Man" on Break Away Angel (2001). Lofgren resurrected five songs he wrote with Reed in the late 70s on Blue with Lou (2019).

The album features contributions from Michael Fonfara, Ellard "Moose" Boles, Don Cherry, Marty Fogel and Michael Suchorsky. The album peaked at No. 13 in New Zealand, No. 44 in Sweden, No. 58 in Australia, and No. 130 in the United States.

Recording
Reed said: "I mastered the art of recording known as 'capture the spontaneous moment and leave it at that'. The Bells was done like that, those lyrics were just made up on the spot and they're absolutely incredible. I'm very adept at making up whole stories with rhymes, schemes, jokes".

Critical reception

In a contemporary review for Rolling Stone, music critic Lester Bangs wrote, "With The Bells, more than in Street Hassle, perhaps even more than in his work with The Velvet Underground, Lou Reed achieves his oft-stated ambition—to become a great writer, in the literary sense". The Village Voice critic Robert Christgau said:

In a less enthusiastic retrospective review, Select magazine wrote that "The Bells saw his music disappearing down the pan ... Even self-parody is barely achieved in these half-assed songs played by a bunch of dullards, with Lou sounding painfully uninspired".

Track listing

Personnel
Credits are adapted from The Bells liner notes.

Musicians
 Lou Reed – lead and backing vocals, electric guitar, guitar synthesizer, bass synthesizer (track 8), horn arrangement (tracks: 1-3, 5-9), producer
 Ellard "Moose" Boles – 12-string electric guitar (track 8), bass guitar, bass synthesizer, backing vocals
 Michael Fonfara – piano, Fender Rhodes, synthesizer, backing vocals, executive producer
 Don Cherry – African hunting guitar, trumpet, horn arrangement (track 4)
 Marty Fogel – ocarina, soprano and tenor saxophone, Fender Rhodes (track 9), horn arrangement
 Michael Suchorsky – percussion

Production and artwork
 René Tinner – engineer
 Manfred Schunke – mixing
 Ted Jensen – mastering
 Donn Davenport – art direction, design
 Howard Fritzson – art direction, design
 Garry Gross – photography

Charts

References

External links
 

1979 albums
Lou Reed albums
Binaural recordings
Arista Records albums
Albums produced by Lou Reed